Robert Elyot (by 1500 – 1545), of Bristol, was an English politician.

He was elected Sheriff of Bristol for 1521–22 and mayor of Bristol for 1540–41. He was  constable of the staple for 1541-42 and auditor, chamberlain's accts. 1541–4.

References

 

1545 deaths
Members of the Parliament of England for Bristol
English MPs 1542–1544
High Sheriffs of Bristol
Year of birth uncertain